= BMW Track Trainer =

BMW Track Trainer

The BMW Track Trainer is a modified BMW 330i that can negotiate a race track autonomously at the limit of traction. It was conceived as a driver training tool that allows a new student to experience the ideal race line from the driver's seat. The vehicle is a research project from BMW Group Research and Technology (BMW Forschung und Technik GmbH).

== Race tracks ==
Track Trainer has raced autonomously at Valencia, Hockenheimring, Lausitzring, Zandvoort, Nordschleife, and Mazda Raceway Laguna Seca.

== Media coverage ==
Track Trainer was covered by Top Gear in a segment during the 2007 season and The Car Show on the third episode of the 2011 season.

== Technology ==
Track Trainer uses a combination of GPS and INS data to create a precision position estimate of the vehicle states in real-time. Vehicle control is commanded to an ideal line recorded by a manually driven reference lap.
